Liliana is derived from the Latin word 'lilium' or 'lilion', both mean 'lily' in English. Due to this, the name  means "pure" and "innocent". The name is generally found in North America, though it is more common in  Italian, Spanish and Portuguese.

Notable people and fictional characters with the name include:

People 
Liliana Abud, Mexican actress in telenovelas and cinema
Liliana Allen (born 1970), Cuban track and field athlete, competing for Mexico
Liliana Leah Archibald (1928–2014), English insurance broker
Liliana Ayalde, American diplomat, former United States ambassador to Brazil
Liliana Barba, Latin American voice actress
Liliana V. Blum (born 1974), Mexican short story writer
Liliana Campos (born 1971), Portuguese television presenter and model
Liliana Castro (born 1979), Ecuadorian-born Brazilian actress
Liliana Cavani (born 1933), Italian film director and screenwriter
Liliana Chalá (born 1965), female athlete from Ecuador
Liliana Díaz Mindurry (born 1953), Argentine writer
Liliana Delfino, Marxist of Argentina
Liliana Dobrescu (born 1971), freestyle swimmer from Romania
Liliana Fellner (born 1957), Argentine Justicialist Party politician
Liliana Gafencu (born 1975), Romanian rower who has won three Olympic gold medals
Claudia Liliana González (born 1970), Colombian actress
Liliana Heker (born 1943), Argentine writer
Liliana Herrero (born 1948), Argentine musician
Liliana Kostova, Bulgarian football striker
Liliana Lewińska (born 2008), Polish rhythmic gymnast
Liliana Lovell (born 1967), entrepreneur, founder of the Coyote Ugly Saloon and Ugly Inc
Liliana Lozano (1978–2009), Colombian actress and beauty queen
Liliana Martinelli (born 1970), female discus thrower from Argentina
Liliana Mayo (born 1952), Peruvian psychologist and special education teacher
Liliana Mumy (born 1994), American teen actress and voice actress
Liliana Năstase (born 1962), Romanian heptathlete
Liliana Negre de Alonso (born 1954), Argentine politician
Liliana Olivero (born 1956), member of the provincial legislature in Córdoba Province, Argentina
Liliana Ortega (born 1965), Venezuelan professor, human rights lawyer and advocate
Liliana Palihovici (born 1971), Moldovan politician
Liliana Popescu (born 1982), Romanian middle-distance runner
Liliana Porter (born 1941), contemporary artist from Argentina
Liliana Queiroz (born 1985), Portuguese model
Liliana Rojas-Suarez (born 1954), Peruvian-born economist
Liliana Ronchetti (1927–1974), Italian basketball player
LiliAna Rose (born 1984), folk-pop, singer-songwriter from New York City
Liliana Santos (born 1980), Portuguese actress and model
Liliana Zagacka (born 1977), Polish triple jumper

Fictional characters
Liliana Vess, necromancer in the trading card game Magic: The Gathering
 Lilliana Hoffman, the main protagonist in Snow White: A Tale of Terror

See also
 Ljiljana, the Serbian form of Liliana
Lobocla liliana, commonly called Marbled Flat, a hesperiid butterfly which is found in Asia
Macomona liliana, or the large wedge shell, a bivalve mollusc of the family Tellinidae
Tomb of Liliana Crociati de Szaszak, tomb in Recoleta Cemetery, Buenos Aires, Argentina, known for its unusual design

References

English feminine given names
Given names derived from plants or flowers
Italian feminine given names
Portuguese feminine given names
Polish feminine given names
Romanian feminine given names
Spanish feminine given names